HART may refer to:

Halt All Racist Tours, New Zealand
Health Advisory and Recovery Team, a British antivaccine pressure group
Heterogeneous Aerial Reconnaissance Team
Highway Addressable Remote Transducer Protocol
Hillsboro Artists' Regional Theatre
Human Assisted Reproductive Technology
Hypervelocity Aircraft Rocket, Tactical

Transportation
Hillsborough Area Regional Transit, Florida
Honolulu Authority for Rapid Transportation, Hawaii
Housatonic Area Regional Transit, Connecticut
Huntington Area Rapid Transit, Long Island, New York

Response or rescue teams
Hazardous area response team, UK
High Acuity Response Team, a type of Rapid response team (medicine)

Science and technology
HART Communications Protocol (Highway Addressable Remote Transducer) - a communication protocol used in the process industries.

See also
 Highly active antiretroviral therapy (HAART), a treatment for HIV